The 121st Fighter Escadrille of the Polish Air Force (Polish: 121. Eskadra Myśliwska) was one of the fighter units of the Polish Army in 1939.

History
In the spring of 1925, the 113th Fighter Squadron was formed as a part of the 11th Fighter Regimenet in the Mokotów Airport. It was equipped with 13 Ansaldo A.1 Balilla fighter planes. The squadron would soon later receive Blériot SPAD 61C1 fighter planes. At the end of 1925 the Squadron would be transferred to the Lida Airport. In 1926, Lieutenant Pil, Bolesław Orliński and aircraft mechanic Leonard Kubiak of the squadron flew from Warsaw to Tokyo and back to Warsaw in 121 hours covering 22,600 km in a Bréguet 19 B.2. In 1928, the 11th Air Regiment would disbanded and 113th Fighter would be transferred to the 2nd Air Regiment and would be redesignated as the 121st Fighter Escadrille.

On July 14, 1928 the Escadrille would be transferred from Lida to Kraków. The Escadrille would often take part in air shows where it would often compete against the 122nd Fighter Escadrille. In 1930, the Escadrille would begin to receive Avia BH-33 fighter planes along with Wibault 70 C1 fighter planes as training aircraft. In August and September 1932, the Escadrille would participate in air parades celebrating Poland's victory in the Challenge International de Tourisme 1932. In 1933, the Escadrille was equipped with PZL P.7a fighter planes. It would take part in another air parade celebrating Poland's victory in the Challenge International de Tourisme 1934. In 1936, the Escadrille would receive the new PZL P.11a fighter plane. In 1938, the Escadrille received the PZL P.11c.

In September 1939 the 121st Fighter Escadrille was attached to the Army Kraków.

Crew and equipment

On 1 September 1939 the escadrille had 10 PZL P.11c airplanes.

The air crew consisted of: 
commanding officer kpt. pil. Tadeusz Sędzielowski

his deputy ppor. pil. Wacław Król

and 11 other pilots:

 ppor. Tadeusz Kowalewski
 ppor. Tadeusz Nowak
 ppor. Władysław Gnyś
 pchor.Władysław Chciuk
 pchor. Ryszard Koczor
 pchor. Franciszek Surma
 plut. Leopold Flanek
 kpr. Jan Kremski
 kpr. Piotr Zaniewski
 st.szer. Tadeusz Arabski
 st.szer. Marian Futro

See also
Polish Air Force order of battle in 1939

References

 

Polish Air Force escadrilles